This is a list of notable painters from, or associated with, Ireland.

A
 Henry Allan (1865–1912)
 William Ashford (1746–1824)

B
 Francis Bacon (1909–1992)
 Robert Ballagh (born 1943)
 John James Barralet (1747–1815)
 George Barret, Sr. (1730–1784)
 William Gerard Barry (1864–1941)
 Rose Maynard Barton (1856–1929)
 Richard Brydges Beechey (1808–1859)
 Pauline Bewick (born 1935)
 Francis Bindon (c. 1690–1765)
 Brian Bourke (born 1936)
 Gretta Bowen (1880–1981)
 John Boyne (c. 1750–1810)
 Charles Brady (1926–1997)
 Muriel Brandt (1909–1981)
 James Brenan (1837–1907)
 Henry Brocas (1762–1837)
 Louis le Brocquy (1916–2012)
 Henry Brooke (1738–1806)
 Christy Brown (1932–1981)
 Adam Buck (1759–1833)
 Augustus Nicholas Burke (1838–1891)
 Thomas Burke (1749–1815)
 Frederick William Burton (1816–1900)
 Mildred Anne Butler (1858–1941)
 John Butts (died 1764)

C
 George Campbell (1917–1979)
 Niccolo d'Ardia Caracciolo (1941–1989)
 Robert Carver (c. 1730–1791)
 John Cassidy (1860–1939)
 Egerton Coghill (1853–1921)
 Charles Collins (c. 1680–1744)
 Patrick Collins (1911–1994)
 John Comerford (1773–1832)
 Barrie Cooke (1931–2014)
 Nigel Cox (born 1959)
 James Humbert Craig (1877–1944)
 Martin Cregan (1788–1870)
 Robert Crone (c. 1740–1779)
 Nicholas Joseph Crowley (1819–1857)
 William Crozier (1930–2011)
 William Cuming (1769–1852)
 Amelia Curran (1775–1847)

D
 Elinor Darwin (1871–1954)
 Gerald Davis (1938–2005)
 William Davis (1812–1873)
 Kate Dobbin (1868–c. 1948)
 Andrew Hastings Doyle (c. 1774–1841)
 Henry Edward Doyle (1827–1893)
 John Doyle (1797–1868)
 Susanna Drury (c. 1698–c. 1770)
 Patrick Vincent Duffy (1832–1909)
 Ronald Ossory Dunlop (1894–1973)
 George Victor Du Noyer (1817–1869)
 Edward Plunkett, 20th Baron of Dunsany (1939–2011)

E
 Felim Egan (1952–2020)
 Alfred Elmore (1815–1881)
 Beatrice Elvery (1881–1970)
 Jacob Ennis (1728–1770)
 Charles Exshaw (died 1771)

F
 Gary Farrelly (born 1983)
 Fergus Feehily (born 1968)
 Sean Fingleton (born 1950)
 Jonathan Fisher (c. 1740–1809)
 Jim Fitzpatrick
 Bridget Flannery (born 1959)
 Stanhope Forbes (1857–1947)
 Samuel Forde (1805–1828)
 Thomas Foster (1798–1826)
 Hugh Frazer (1795–1865)
 Percy French (1854–1920)
 Thomas Frye (1710–1762)

G
 Gaspare Gabrielli (1770–1828)
 Norman Garstin (1847–1926)
 Edmund Garvey (1740–1813)
 Robert Gibbings (1889–1958)
 Grace Gifford (1888–1955)
 William St. John Glenn (1904–1974)
 Robert Charles Goff (1837–1922)
 William Crampton Gore (1871–1946)
 Reginald Gray (1930–2013)
 Nathaniel Grogan (1740–1807)
 Beatrice Gubbins (1878–1944)

H
 Gustavus Hamilton (1739–1775)
 Hugh Douglas Hamilton (c. 1740–1808)
 Letitia Marion Hamilton (1878–1964)
 James Hanley (born 1965)
 Alice Hanratty (born 1939)
 Sarah Cecilia Harrison (1863–1941)
 Henry Albert Hartland (1840–1893)
 Edwin Hayes (1819–1904)
 Joseph Patrick Haverty (1794–1864)
 Patrick Hennessy (1915–1980)
 William John Hennessy (1839–1917)
 Mary Balfour Herbert (1817–1893)
 Paul Henry (1877–1958)
 Patrick Hickey (1927–1998)
 Thomas Hickey (1741–1824)
 Nathaniel Hill (1861–1934)
 Evie Hone (1894–1955)
 Nathaniel Hone the Elder (1718–1784)
 Nathaniel Hone the Younger (1831–1917)
 Thomas Hovenden (1840–1895)
 Hugh Howard (1675–1737)
 Robert Hunter (fl. 1748–1780)
 Philip Hussey (died 1783)

I
 Charles C. Ingham (c. 1796–1863)

J
 Mainie Jellett (1897–1944)
 Charles Jervas (c. 1675–1739)
 James Le Jeune (1910–1983)
 George W. Joy (1844–1925)

K
 Paul Kane (1810–1871)
 Joseph Malachy Kavanagh (1856–1918)
 Seán Keating (1889–1977)
 Frances Kelly (1908–2002)
 Phil Kelly (1850–2010)
 Harry Kernoff (1900–1974)
 Cecil King (1921–1986)
 John Kingerlee (born 1936)
 William Burke Kirwan (1814–1880?)

L
 James Latham (c. 1696–1747)
 John Lavery (1856–1941)
 Thomas Lawranson (fl. 1760–1777)
 Edward Daniel Leahy (1797–1875)
 William John Leech (1881–1968)
 Samuel Lover (1797–1868)

M
 Gladys Maccabe (1918–2018)
 Daniel Maclise (1806–1870)
 Henry MacManus (c. 1810–1870)
 Anne Madden (born 1932)
 James Malton (1761–1803)
 Padraig Marrinan (1906–1975)
 Fergus Martin (born 1955)
 Charles McAuley (1910–1999)
 Sheila McClean
 Samuel McCloy (1831–1904)
 Niall McCormack (born 1960)
 Siobhan McDonald
 Norah McGuinness (1901–1980)
 Edward McGuire (1932–1986)
 Frank McKelvey (1895–1974)
 Nick Miller (born 1962)
 Flora Mitchell (1890–1973)
 Jack Morrow (1872–1926)
 Richard Moynan (1856–1906)
 Michael Mulcahy (born 1952)
 George Mullins (fl. 1763–1765)
 William Mulready (1786–1863)
 Bernard Mulrenin (1803–1868)
 George Francis Mulvany (1809–1869)
 Garret Murphy (c. 1650–1716)

N
 Andrew Nicholl (1804–1886)
 Charles Wynne Nicholls (1831–1903)
 Evin Nolan (1930–2016)

O
 Dermod O'Brien (1865–1945)
 Diarmuid O'Ceallacháin (1915–1993)
 James Arthur O'Connor (1792–1841)
 John O'Connor (1830–1889)
 Roderic O'Conor (1860–1940)
 Mick O'Dea (born 1958)
 John O'Keeffe (c. 1797–1838)
 Aloysius O'Kelly (1853–1936)
 Tony O'Malley (1913–2003)
 Frank O'Meara (1853–1888)
 Daniel O'Neill (1920–1974)
 George Bernard O'Neill (1828–1917)
 William Orpen (1878–1931)
 Walter Osborne (1859–1903)
 Seán O'Sullivan (1906–1964)

P
 James Pearson (died 1837)
 Stanley Pettigrew (born 1927)
 George Petrie (1790–1866)
 Alexander Pope (1763–1835)
 Sarah Purser (1848–1943)

R
 John Ramage (1748–1802)
 Nano Reid (1900–1981)
 Anne Rigney (born 1957)
 Thomas Roberts (1748–1778)
 Markey Robinson (1918–1999)
 Sampson Towgood Roch (1757–1847)
 Richard Rothwell (1800–1868)
 Thomas Charles Leeson Rowbotham (1823–1875)
 George William Russell (1867–1935)
 John Ryan (1925–1992)

S
 William Sadler (c. 1782–1839)
 Robert Richard Scanlan (1801–1876)
 Patrick Scott (1921–2014)
 Sean Scully (born 1945)
 Kevin Sharkey (born 1961)
 Martin Archer Shee (1769–1850)
 James Sleator (1886–1950)
 Hamilton Sloan (born 1945)
 Stephen Catterson Smith (1806–1872)
 Brian Smyth (born 1967)
 Estella Solomons (1882–1968)
 Edith Somerville (1858–1949)
 Camille Souter (born 1929)
 Edyth Starkie (1867–1941)
 Stella Steyn (1907–1987)
 Patrick Swift (1927–1983)

T
 Henry Jones Thaddeus (1859–1929)
 Sydney Mary Thompson (1847–1923)
 Phoebe Anna Traquair (1852–1936)
 Cesca Chenevix Trench (1881–1918)
 Henry Tresham (c. 1751–1814)
 Patrick Tuohy (1894–1930)

W
 Francis S. Walker (1848–1916)
 Thomas Bond Walker (1861–1933)
 Owen Walsh (1933–2002)
 Robert West (died 1770)
 Leo Whelan (1892–1956)
 Maurice Canning Wilks (1910–1984)
 Alexander Williams (1846–1930)
 W. G. Wills (1828–1891)
 Patrick Wybrant (1816–1894)
 Gladys Wynne (1876–1968)

Y
 Anne Yeats (1919–2001)
 Jack Butler Yeats (1871–1957)
 John Butler Yeats (1839–1922)

See also
 Irish art
 List of Irish artists
 List of Northern Irish artists

Irish painters
Irish painters
Painters